Russ Woody is an American author, television producer and writer.

Career
Woody grew up in Walnut Creek, California. In 1979, he graduated from California State University, Chico with a bachelor's degree in Broadcast Journalism and a minor in Speech and Drama.

Since the early 1980s, he has amassed a number of producing and writing credits in television in the series Benson, Fantasy Island, Webster, Newhart, Valerie's Family, St. Elsewhere, Hill Street Blues, Parenthood, Good Sports, Room for Two, Double Rush, Mad About You, The Drew Carey Show, Cybill (for which he won a Golden Globe Award), Style & Substance, Becker, True Jackson, VP, Notes from the Underbelly, The Middle and Murphy Brown, for which he won a Primetime Emmy Award as a part of the show's writing team. He also worked as a production assistant on Bosom Buddies and Family Ties.

Personal life
Woody currently lives in Los Angeles and Ventura with his wife, Catherine, and his sons, Henry and Joe.

References
 russwoody.com

External links

Russ Woody Official Website

21st-century American novelists
American male novelists
Television producers from California
American television writers
American male television writers
California State University, Chico alumni
Emmy Award winners
Living people
People from Ventura, California
Year of birth missing (living people)
American male screenwriters
21st-century American male writers
Novelists from California
Screenwriters from California
20th-century American male writers
20th-century American screenwriters
People from Walnut Creek, California
21st-century American screenwriters